The Ambassador of the Kingdom of Yugoslavia to the Kingdom of Sweden was the Kingdom of Yugoslavia's foremost diplomatic representative to the Kingdom of Sweden. The ambassador was the head of the Kingdom of Yugoslavia's diplomatic mission. The position ended with the Second World War and the creation of the Socialist Federal Republic of Yugoslavia in 1946.

List of heads of mission

Envoy Extraordinary and Minister Plenipotentiary to the King of Sweden

Notes

References

Yugoslavia
Lists of ambassadors of the Kingdom of Yugoslavia